Danilo Sbardellotto (born 23 October 1960) is an Italian former alpine skier who competed in the 1984 Winter Olympics, 1988 Winter Olympics, and 1992 Winter Olympics.

References

External links
 

1960 births
Living people
Italian male alpine skiers
Olympic alpine skiers of Italy
Alpine skiers at the 1984 Winter Olympics
Alpine skiers at the 1988 Winter Olympics
Alpine skiers at the 1992 Winter Olympics
Alpine skiers of Fiamme Gialle
Italian alpine skiing coaches